Dickie Martin may refer to:

Harry B. Martin (1873 – 1959), American cartoonist and golf writer
Richard Frewen Martin (1918 – 2006), British test pilot

See also
Dick Martin (disambiguation)
Richard Martin (disambiguation)